Evgeny Sazonov (born 27 September 1936) Leningrad, RSFSR, USSR) is a theater director, teacher and artistic director of Theater of Youth Creativity (TYUT), Honored Cultural Worker of the RSFSR.

Biography
Evgeny's first degree was in Pediatrics. He graduated from Saint Petersburg State Pediatric Medical University and for several years worked as a pediatrician.

In 1951 he enrolled in a drama club led by Matvey Dubrovin and that determined his subsequent life and career.

He graduated from the Boris Shchukin Theatre Institute, majoring in directing for drama in Boris Zakhava's group.

In 1974, after the death of the founder of Theater of Youth Creativity Matvey Dubrovin, he became the artistic director of TYUT.

Among the students of Evgeny Sazonov, pupils of Theater of Youth Creativity contain many well known people, such as Nikolay Fomenko, Alexei Devotchenko, Roman Trakhtenberg and many other theater workers and outstanding people of different professions.

He is an honorable winner of the "Golden Sofit" (2016) - with a golden sign  "For the dedicated work of many years on the education of new generations of theater for the Russian Theater".

Performances and productions
 Rudolf Katz, Evgeny Sazonov "Long-distance trains"
 Evgeny Sazonov "Timur remains on the Bridge", director Evgeny Sazonov
 Rudolf Katz, Evgeny Sazonov "Three swords for the three"
 Rudolf Katz "Tilly-Tilly-testo", director Evgeny Sazonov
 Mikhail Arkadyevich Svetlov "20 years later", director Evgeny Sazonov
 Rudolf Katz "All of us and bulldozers", director Evgeny Sazonov
 Evgeny Schwartz "The citizens of Leningrad", director Evgeny Sazonov
 Alexander Vampilov "Eldest son", director Evgeny Sazonov
 Evgeny Sazonov "Max", director Evgeny Sazonov
 Evgeny Sazonov "Million's visitor", director Evgeny Sazonov
 Rudolf Katz "Garden", director Evgeny Sazonov
 Aleksei Arbuzov "City at dawn", director Evgeny Sazonov
 Alexander Khmeli "And yet it moves, or the alien rushes through the sky", director Evgeny Sazonov
 Georgy Polonsky "Ordinary fairy tale", director Evgeny Sazonov
 Evgeny Sazonov "Ivan, Ivan's Grandson", director Evgeny Sazonov
 Evgeny Sazonov "Afanasyeva, make a step forward", director Evgeny Sazonov
 Evgeny Sazonov "Marshak's square", director Evgeny Sazonov
 Rudolf Katz "The scenes at the Pushkin's House", director Evgeny Sazonov
 Ray Bradbury "Fahrenheit 451", director Evgeny Sazonov
 Antoine de Saint-Exupéry "The Little Prince", director Evgeny Sazonov
 Astrid Lindgren "Ronia the Robber's Daughter", director Evgeny Sazonov
 William Shakespeare "Romeo and Juliet", director Evgeny Sazonov
 Edmond Rostand "Cyrano de Bergerac", director Evgeny Sazonov
 Astrid Lindgren "Pippi Longstocking", director Evgeny Sazonov
 Anton Chekhov "Uncle Vanya", director Evgeny Sazonov
 Alexander Volodin "Lizard", director Evgeny Sazonov
 Arkady Averchenko "End of love", director Evgeny Sazonov
 William Shakespeare "Hamlet", director Evgeny Sazonov
 Sławomir Mrożek "Portrait", director Evgeny Sazonov

Literature
 Evgeny Sazonov "City of the Masters: From the experience of the Leningrad Theater of Youth Creativity of the Order of the Red Banner of the Palace of Pioneers" - Moscow: Pedagogika, 1984, 129 p.
 Evgeny Sazonov "Particles of the whole" - St. Petersburg: Baltic Seasons, 2011, 486 p. - 
 Theater of Youth Creativity - Teaching magazine "Rakurs" No.  25, St. Petersburg: GOU "SPbGDTYu" 2006. - 76 p. -

References

External links
 The TV channel "St. Petersburg": 75 years Evgeny Sazonov (in Russia)
 Theater of Youth Creativity in St. Petersburg Palace of Youth Creativity (in Russia)
 Life-long TYUT (in Russia)
 Theater of Youth Creativity (in Russia)
 Pedagogy of Culture: I teach theater (in Russia)

Living people
Theatre directors from Saint Petersburg
Russian drama teachers
1936 births